Lebogang Mothiba (born 28 January 1996) is a South African professional soccer player who plays as a striker for Ligue 1 club Strasbourg and the South Africa national team.

He made his professional debut in 2017 for Ligue 2 side Valenciennes, whilst on loan from Lille, before returning to his parent club the following year. There, he scored six goals in 17 appearances  before transferring to fellow Ligue 1 side Strasbourg in August 2018 with whom he won the Coupe de la Ligue in his debut season.

Having previously represented South Africa at the 2016 Summer Olympics, Mothiba broke into the senior side in 2018 after which he became the first player to score in three consecutive matches for the nation from debut.

Club career

Early career
Mothiba spent his formative years on the books of local side Mamelodi Sundowns. He never progressed to the club's first team, however, and later joined Diambars academy in South Africa from whence he was signed by French side, Lille in 2014, shortly after his nineteenth birthday.

Lille
In July 2014, Mothiba signed for Ligue 1 side Lille on a three-year contract where he joined the club's under-19 side. He spent the next two seasons with the club's youth and reserve sides before signing his first professional contract with the club, penning a three-year deal. Midway through the 2016–17 campaign he joined Ligue 2 side Valenciennes on a two-year loan deal. He scored two goals in nine appearances for the campaign which prompted Valenciennes to extend his loan for a further season. Mothiba added a further eight goals in 20 appearances for the club before his form, coupled with Lille's domestic struggles, saw his parent club recall him mid-way through his second loan stint. With Lille battling against the prospect of relegation, Mothiba returned to score five goals in 14 appearances, including a brace against Dijon on the final day of the season, to ensure that the club avoided the drop to Ligue 2. Despite his form in the season prior, however, Mothiba was forced to leave Lille during the early stages of the 2018–19 campaign after the club ran into financial difficulties.

Strasbourg
On 31 August 2018, the last day of the 2018 summer transfer window, and with Lille facing financial difficulties, Mothiba was sold to league rivals Starsbourg for a reported transfer fee of €4 million. The deal also involved a buyback option and a 50% sell-on clause for Lille. He scored his first goal for the club in his second appearance when he netted in the third minute of injury time to earn his side a point against Montpellier. On 30 March, he started in Strasbourg's penalty shoot-out win over Guingamp to help the club lift the Coupe de la Ligue title.

On 9 November 2019, on the occasion of his 50th appearance for Strasbourg, Mothiba ended a five-month goal drought with a brace in the club's 4–1 league win over Nîmes Olympique.

On 27 January 2022, Mothiba joined Troyes on loan until the end of the season.

International career
Mothiba represented South Africa at the football competition of the 2016 Summer Olympics. In March 2018, he scored on his full debut during a Four Nations Tournament draw with Angola. In October, during a 2019 Africa Cup of Nations qualification match against Seychelles, he became the first player to score in three consecutive matches for South Africa from debut. His goal also contributed towards the nation recording its largest ever victory with the match ending 6–0 in favour of South Africa.
Fans sing, "Mothiba, the South African Oaf" from the terraces, in response to Mo Salah being known as "The Egyptian King" by Egypt fans.

Career statistics

Club

International

Scores and results list South Africa's goal tally first, score column indicates score after each Mothiba goal.

Honours
Strasbourg
 Coupe de la Ligue: 2018–19
South Africa
Four Nations Tournament: 2018

References

External links
 

1996 births
Living people
Soccer players from Johannesburg
Association football forwards
South African soccer players
Footballers at the 2016 Summer Olympics
2019 Africa Cup of Nations players
Olympic soccer players of South Africa
Ligue 1 players
Ligue 2 players
Championnat National 3 players
Valenciennes FC players
Lille OSC players
RC Strasbourg Alsace players
ES Troyes AC players
South African expatriate soccer players
Expatriate footballers in France
South African expatriate sportspeople in France
South Africa international soccer players